Jake Seal is a British film producer.

Personal life
Seal is married to Jodie Seal, who was Miss Australia in 1996.  They have three sons.  Formerly a resident of London, Seal resides in Louisiana as of 2015.

Filmography

As producer

As actor

References

External links
 

British film producers
Living people
Film producers from Louisiana
Film producers from London
British expatriates in the United States
Year of birth missing (living people)